Delpech is a French surname. Notable people with the surname include:

 Anthony Delpech (born 1969), French-South African jockey
 Bertrand Poirot-Delpech (1929–2006), French journalist, essayist and novelist
 François-Séraphin Delpech (1778–1825), French lithographer and printer
 Jacques Mathieu Delpech (1777–1832), French surgeon
 Jeanine Delpech (1905–1992), French journalist, translator, novelist
 Jean-Luc Delpech (born 1979), French cyclist
 Michel Delpech (1946–2016), French musician and actor

See also 
 Delpuech

French-language surnames